

The Spælsau (Old Norwegian Short Tail Landrace, Gamalnorsk spæl Norwegian) is a breed of sheep from Norway. Many consider Spælsau to be the original breed of sheep in Norway, and it is one of the Northern European short-tailed sheep breeds. It is well adapted to the climate and was a domestic animal from the Iron Age. The spælsau stock is about 22% of the sheep in Norway. 

In 1912, to prevent extinction of the breed, two breeding stations were established. Icelandic sheep were crossed through semen imported in the 1960s and 1970s. Finnsheep and Faroe Island sheep were also used in the breeding program.  This breed is raised primarily for meat.

Characteristics
Originally it is compact and lightly built and does not need much concentrated food. The meat has relatively little fat. The Spælsau gives rich milk, has a strong flock instinct, and manages well outdoors most of the year. But it is vulnerable to eye disease caused by eating the plant Bog Asphodel (Narthecium ossifragum). Wool colours include black and white but common among older types (Gamalnorsk and Villsau) are many variations and shades of grey (known as `blue`) and brown (known as `red`)

Uses

It gives milk and meat of good quality. The wool is characterised through having two layers: An outer longhaired glossy undulating layer of wool protecting the underlying layer against wind and rain, and an underlying layer which keeps the sheep warm. The long protective wool which is used for weaving is traditionally spun into two-strand tightly-spun yarn instead of the usual three-strand type, resulting in a beautiful lustre.  This spælsau yarn was used in the Norwegian old tapestries from the Renaissance and Baroque times. The Viking ship sails were made from spælsau yarn. The wool was also in the old days used in clothing because it was light, stable and absorbed little moisture.

See also 
 Norwegian Elkhound
 Norwegian Lundehund
 Norwegian Forest Cat
 Icelandic goat
 Norwegian chicken landrace
 Old Norwegian Sheep

References

External links
Sheep-Isles

Sheep breeds
Sheep breeds originating in Norway
Sheep landraces